Qazaxyolçular (also, Kazakhëlchular) is a village and municipality in the Dashkasan Rayon of Azerbaijan.  It has a population of 346.

References 

Populated places in Dashkasan District